Calcatodrillia hololeukos is a species of sea snail, a marine gastropod mollusk in the family Pseudomelatomidae.

Description
The length of the shell attains 18 mm.

Distribution
This marine species occurs off the Cape Province, South Africa.

References

 R.N. Kilburn (1988), Turridae (Mollusca: Gastropoda) of southern Africa and Mozambique. Part 4. Subfamilies Drilliinae, Crassispirinae and Strictispirinae; Ann. Natal Mus. Vol. 29(1) pp. 167–320

External links
 
 

Endemic fauna of South Africa
hololeukos
Gastropods described in 1988